Fageiella is a genus of Balkan dwarf spiders that was first described by J. Kratochvíl in 1934.  it contains only two species: F. ensigera and F. patellata.

See also
 List of Linyphiidae species (A–H)

References

Araneomorphae genera
Linyphiidae